Nikola Milinković (born 19 March 1968) is a Serbian retired footballer who played as a midfielder.

Career
Born in Sanski Most, SR Bosnia and Herzegovina, at the time part of Yugoslavia, Milinković started playing with local side Radnički Zdena. Just before the Bosnian War started, he moved to Serbia and played with FK Bečej. He was spotted by Spanish club Lleida that signed him in 1993. He moved to Almería two years later where he had a short spell. He moved twice more to two other clubs on the Iberian Peninsula where he had similarly short spells, namely Ourense and Portuguese clubs Chaves and Alverca. In 2001, he signed with Austrian club Grazer AK where he spent four seasons and effectively retired from professional football with ASK Schwadorf. He ended his career at Austrian lower league side USV Markt Hartmannsdorf.

Personal life
Milinković is the father of footballers and Serbia internationals Sergej Milinković-Savić and Vanja Milinković-Savić and basketball player Jana Milinković-Savić.

References

External links
 Profile at Playerhistory
 Stats from Spain at LFP
 

1968 births
Living people
People from Sanski Most
Serbs of Bosnia and Herzegovina
Association football midfielders
Yugoslav footballers
Bosnia and Herzegovina footballers
OFK Bečej 1918 players
UE Lleida players
UD Almería players
G.D. Chaves players
CD Ourense footballers
F.C. Alverca players
Grazer AK players
ASK Schwadorf players
FK Radnički Niš players
First League of Serbia and Montenegro players
La Liga players
Segunda División players
Primeira Liga players
Austrian Football Bundesliga players
Second League of Serbia and Montenegro players
Bosnia and Herzegovina expatriate footballers
Serbian expatriate footballers
Expatriate footballers in Spain
Expatriate footballers in Portugal
Expatriate footballers in Austria
Bosnia and Herzegovina expatriate sportspeople in Portugal
Bosnia and Herzegovina expatriate sportspeople in Spain
Bosnia and Herzegovina expatriate sportspeople in Austria
Serbian expatriate sportspeople in Portugal
Serbian expatriate sportspeople in Spain
Serbian expatriate sportspeople in Austria